Haplochromis maculipinna is a species of cichlid endemic to Lake Victoria.  This species can reach a length of  SL.

References 

Fish described in 1913
maculipinna
Endemic freshwater fish of Kenya
Fish of Lake Victoria
Taxonomy articles created by Polbot